The Bharipa Bahujan Mahasangh (IAST: Bhāripa Bahujana Mahāsaṅgha;  BBM) was an Indian political party founded by Prakash Ambedkar on 4 July 1994. The party was a splinter group of the Republican Party of India and had its roots in the Scheduled Castes Federation led by B. R. Ambedkar. The president of the party was Prakash Ambedkar. The complete name of the party is Bharatiya Republican Paksha - Bahujan Mahasangh (Republican Party of India - Majority Grand Union). BBM was primarily based in Maharashtra. In 2019, BBM merged into the Vanchit Bahujan Aghadi, new political party founded by Prakash Ambedkar.

History 
The party was formed on 4 July 1994, through a split in the Republican Party of India. The party was led by Prakash Ambedkar, the grandson of B. R. Ambedkar.

In the elections to the Maharashtra state assembly 1999 BBM put up 34 candidates. In the 13th Lok Sabha elections during 1999, Ambedkar was elected from the constituency Akola.

In the Lok Sabha election 2004 the party lost its parliamentary representation. In total the party had launched 16 candidates, all from Maharashtra. In Akola, Ambedkar was defeated by a Bharatiya Janata Party (BJP) candidate. BBM totalled 606,827 votes, and won three seats.

In 2014 Maharashtra Legislative Assembly election Baliram Sirskar won from Balapur in Akola on Bharipa Bahujan Mahasangh ticket by a margin of 6939 votes.

On 20 March 2018, Prakash Ambedkar founded new political party named the Vanchit Bahujan Aghadi. On 14 March 2019, Ambedkar has announced the Bharipa Bahujan Mahasangh will merge with the Vanchit Bahujan Aghadi. He said that, despite the 'Akola pattern' of social engineering through the success of the Bharipa-Bahujan Mahasangh, the word 'Bharipa' (RPI) had limited the expansion of the party. He said that after the Lok Sabha elections 2019, the Bharipa Bahujan Mahasangh will merge with the Vanchit Bahujan Aghadi, because the Vanchit Bahujan Aghadi is acceptable in a broad sense. On 8 November 2019, the Bharipa Bahujan Mahasangha merged into the Vanchit Bahujan Aghadi.

Electoral Performance

Lok Sabha Elections

Maharashtra Vidhan Sabha Elections

See also
Vanchit Bahujan Aghadi

References

External links
Interview with P.Y. Ambedkar in Indian Express

Political parties in Maharashtra
Political parties established in 1994
1994 establishments in Maharashtra
2019 disestablishments in India
Republican Party of India
Political parties disestablished in 2019
Ambedkarite political parties
Dalit politics